Jovan Kratohvil (17 April 1924 – 22 February 1998) was a Yugoslav sports shooter. He competed in the 300 m rifle, three positions event at the 1952 Summer Olympics.

References

1924 births
1998 deaths
Yugoslav male sport shooters
Olympic shooters of Yugoslavia
Shooters at the 1952 Summer Olympics
Sportspeople from Belgrade